The International Puppet Fringe Festival NYC (also stylised as IPFFNYC or Puppet Fringe NYC) is a biannual puppet theater fringe festival hosted by Teatro SEA in the Lower East Side of New York City. The festival had its 1st edition in 2018, at the Clemente Soto Velez Cultural and Educational Center, and featured puppet shows, short films and artist talks with international puppet theater companies. The Puppet Fringe Festival is the first ever international fringe festival dedicated to puppetry.

2018 Edition 
In its inaugural year, the Puppet Fringe Festival held puppet cabarets hosted by the Puppetry Guild of Greater New York and Great Small Works, as well as an Artist Symposium hosted by UNIMA-USA, an international puppet union founded by Jim Henson in 1966. The Puppet Fringe Festival was produced by Manuel Antonio Moran, the Artistic director of Teatro SEA, and was held at the Clemente Soto Velez Cultural and Educational Center, from the 8 to 12 August 2018. The Puppet Fringe Festival hosted puppet companies from all around the world, including France, Canada, Puerto Rico and Costa Rica, as well as a handful of companies from the USA itself. The festival's international element was a key aspect of its appeal, with Time Out New York describing the festival as "a celebration of diversity, inclusion and of course beautiful performances".

The inaugural Puppet Fringe Festival was dedicated to José López Alemán, a Puerto Rican artist and Puppet Master for Teatro SEA who had worked in the puppetry industry for over 40 years.

Among the participating companies in 2018 were:

 Agua, Sol y Sereno (Puerto Rico) 
 Chinese Theatre Works (USA)
 Compañía La Bicicleta (Costa Rica)
 Drama of Works (USA)
 La Tortue Noire (Canada)
 Les Anges au Plafond (France)
 Paper Heart Puppets (USA)
 Red Herring (USA)
 Wonderspark (USA)

2021 Edition 
The 2nd International Puppet Fringe Festival NYC had to be postponed from August 2020 to August 2021 due to the COVID-19 Pandemic. This festival was covered in a full page article by the New York Times and other news outlets such as New York Theater. This edition had 5 days of in-person performances. It included more than 50 shows and events, short films, and art exhibitions. There was also a collaboration with the Museum of the City of New York and their "Puppets of New York" exhibit. The festival also provided adult workshops involving the construction of puppet construction. 

Participating individuals and companies include:

 Deborah Hunt
 Bruce Cannon, Artistic Director of Swedish Cottage Marionette Theater  
 Shari Lewis and Lamp Chop
 Chinese Theater Works
 Jim Henson Estate
 Ralph Lee
 The Manteo Family
 Derek Fordjour
 Nick Lehane
 Monxo López, Andrew W. Mellon Foundation fellow and Curator

References 

Fringe festivals in the United States
Puppet festivals
Puppetry in the United States